Yarovenko is a surname. Notable people with the surname include:

 Evgeny Yarovenko (born 1963), Soviet footballer and coach
 Natasha Yarovenko (born 1979), Ukrainian actress and model

See also
 
 Yakovenko

Ukrainian-language surnames